Palmetto is an unincorporated community in northeastern Pickens County, Alabama, United States.

History
Palmetto was named for Palmetto, another unincorporated community in South Carolina. A post office operated under the name Palmetto from 1853 to 1905.

Transportation
The community is served by an Alabama state highway and two Pickens County roads:
  – north to Kennedy and State Route 96 (in Lamar County) and south to Reform
  – south to Reform and SR 17
  – northeast to Pickens County Road 51 and Ashcraft Corner (in Fayette County)

References

Unincorporated communities in Pickens County, Alabama
Unincorporated communities in Alabama